Franz Edmund Weirotter (May 1733 – 11 May 1771) was an Austrian painter, draughtsman and etcher.

Weirotter was born in Innsbruck, and painted primarily landscapes and maritime scenes. He traveled to Paris and Rome where he produced a number of paintings and etchings. 
Some of his works reside at the Fine Arts Museums of San Francisco. Weirotter died in Vienna on 11 May 1771.

References

1733 births
1771 deaths
18th-century Austrian painters
18th-century Austrian male artists
Austrian male painters
Artists from Innsbruck